United States gubernatorial elections were held in 1950, in 33 states, concurrent with the House and Senate elections, on November 7, 1950 (September 11 in Maine).

In Connecticut, the governor was elected to a 4-year term for the first time, instead of a 2-year term.

Results

References

 
November 1950 events in the United States